The 1st North Carolina Cavalry Regiment, initially formed as 9th Regiment, North Carolina State Troops, was a cavalry regiment from North Carolina that served in the Confederate States Army during the American Civil War. Raised in 1861 it served all over the Eastern Theater until it surrendered with the Army of Northern Virginia in 1865.

Companies
Company A - Jefferson, Ashe County
Company B - Rich Square, Northampton County
Company C (Mecklenburg Rangers) - Charlotte, Mecklenburg County
Company D (Watauga Rangers) - Boone, Watauga County
Company E - Warrenton, Warren County
Company F (Cabarrus Rangers) - Concord, Cabarrus County
Company G (Buncombe Rangers) - Asheville, Buncombe County
Company H - Goldsboro, Wayne County
Company I - Kenansville, Duplin County
Company K (Nantahala Rangers) - Franklin, Macon County

Commanders
Col. Robert Ransom, Jr. (promoted to brigadier general)
Col. Lawrence S. Baker (promoted to brigadier general)
Col. James B. Gordon (promoted to brigadier general)
Col. Thomas Hart Ruffin (mortally wounded, died October 17, 1863)
Col. William H. Cheek

See also
List of North Carolina Confederate Civil War units

References

Further reading
Ninth Regiment (First Cavalry) in Histories of the Several Regiments and Battalions from North Carolina, in the Great War 1861-'65, Vol. I (1905)

Units and formations of the Confederate States Army from North Carolina
1861 establishments in North Carolina
Military units and formations established in 1861